North Korea Census may refer to:
 1993 North Korea Census
 2008 North Korea Census
 2018 North Korea Census

See also 
 Central Bureau of Statistics (North Korea)